Dolní Dvůr is a municipality and village in Trutnov District in the Hradec Králové Region of the Czech Republic. It has about 300 inhabitants.

History
The first written mention of Dolní Dvůr is from 1539. In 1601, the village was separated from Lánov and the municipality was founded.

Sights
The landmark of Dolníá Dvůr is the Church of Saint Joseph. It was built in the Neoclassical style in 1802–1806. It is equipped by a unique carillon.

References

Villages in Trutnov District